Kamakou is the highest peak on the island of Molokai, at . It is part of the extinct East Molokai shield volcano, which comprises the east side of the island. 
Kamakou is located within the  Molokai Forest Reserve, estimated to contain more than 250 rare native Hawaiian plants, many of which exist only in this part of the world. Rare birds can also be found, with two examples being the olomaʻo (Molokai thrush) and kākāwahie (Molokai creeper). Monthly tours are held by The Nature Conservancy.


See also

List of mountain peaks of the United States
List of volcanoes of the United States
List of mountain peaks of Hawaii
List of Ultras of Oceania
List of Ultras of the United States
Hawaii hotspot
Evolution of Hawaiian volcanoes
Hawaiian–Emperor seamount chain

References

Volcanoes of Maui Nui
Mountains of Hawaii
Landforms of Molokai
Pleistocene volcanoes
Pleistocene Oceania
Cenozoic Hawaii